The Third Cabinet of Stauning was the government of Denmark from 4 November 1935 to 15 September 1939. It replaced the Second Stauning Cabinet, and was replaced by the Fourth Stauning Cabinet.

List of ministers
The cabinet consisted of these ministers, with some continuing into the Fourth Stauning Cabinet:

References

1935 establishments in Denmark
1939 disestablishments in Denmark
Stauning III